Luigi Minchillo (born 17 March 1955) is an Italian former professional boxer who competed from 1977 to 1988. He twice challenged for a light middleweight world title in 1984. As an amateur, he competed in the men's welterweight event at the 1976 Summer Olympics.

References

External links
 

1955 births
Living people
Italian male boxers
Olympic boxers of Italy
Boxers at the 1976 Summer Olympics
Competitors at the 1975 Mediterranean Games
Mediterranean Games silver medalists for Italy
Sportspeople from the Province of Foggia
Mediterranean Games medalists in boxing
Welterweight boxers
Light-middleweight boxers
European Boxing Union champions
20th-century Italian people